Fred Kaufman is a Canadian justice, lawyer, and arbitrator.

Career
He graduated with a Bachelor of Science degree from Bishop's University and then spent six years as a reporter for the Montreal Star. He graduated from the McGill University Faculty of Law in 1954, where he was the second ever Editor-in-chief of the McGill Law Journal. After law school he founded the law firm Kaufman, Yarosky & Fish. Kaufman was appointed to the Québec Court of Appeal in 1973, and became Acting Chief Justice of Québec from 1990-91. In 2005 he published the memoir Searching for Justice: An Autobiography.

References

Judges in Quebec
Bishop's University alumni
Writers from Montreal
Living people
McGill University Faculty of Law alumni
Year of birth missing (living people)
McGill Law Journal editors